Jean Cau (8 July 1925, in Bram, Aude - 18 June 1993) was a French writer and journalist.

Born in Bram, Aude, he was secretary to Jean-Paul Sartre, after which he was a journalist and reporter for L'Express, Figaro, and Paris Match.  In 1961, he was awarded the Prix Goncourt for The Mercy of God.

From the 1970s onwards he grew close to GRECE and his writings became infused with a sun-worshipping neopaganism. Jacques Marlaud dedicated an entire chapter to Cau in his study on contemporary literary and philosophical paganism.

Works

 Le Fort intérieur, Gallimard, 1948
 Maria-nègre, Gallimard, 1948 
 Le coup de barre, Gallimard, 1950 
 Le tour d'un monde,Gallimard, 1952 
 Les Paroissiens, Gallimard, 1958 
 Mon village, Gallimard, 1958 
 Vie et mort d'un toro brave, Gallimard, 1961
 The Mercy of God (La pitié de Dieu), Gallimard, 1961 ,  (Prix Goncourt)
 Les Parachutistes - Le maître du monde, Gallimard, 1963 
 Le Meurtre d'un enfant, Gallimard, 1965 
 Lettre ouverte aux têtes de chiens occidentaux, Albin Michel, 1967 
 "Un testament de Staline", Grasset, 1967 
 "Les yeux crevés", Gallimard, 1968 (pièce de théâtre)
 Le pape est mort, La Table Ronde, 1968 
 Le spectre de l'amour, Gallimard, 1968 
 L'agonie de la vieille, La Table Ronde, 1969 
 Tropicanas, de la dictature et de la revolution sous les tropiques, Gallimard, 1970 
 Les Entrailles du taureau, Gallimard, 1971 
 Le temps des esclaves, La Table Ronde, 1971 
 Les entrailles du taureau, Gallimard, 1971 
 Ma misogynie, Julliard, 1972
 Les écuries de l'occident - traité de morale, La Table Ronde, 1973 
 La grande prostituée - traité de morale II, La Table Ronde, 1974 
 Les Enfants, Gallimard, 1975 
 Pourquoi la France, La Table Ronde, 1975 
 Lettre ouverte à tout le monde, Albin Michel, 1976 
 Otages, Gallimard, 1976 
 Une nuit à Saint-Germain des Près, Julliard, 1977 
 Discours de la décadence, Copernic, 1978 
 Une Passion Pour Che Guevara, Julliard, 1979 
 Nouvelles du paradis, Gallimard, 1980 
 La Conquête de Zanzibar, Gallimard, 1980 
 Le grand soleil, Julliard, 1981 
 La barbe et la rose, La Table Ronde, 1982 
 Une rose à la mer, La Table Ronde, 1983 
 Proust, le chat et moi, La Table Ronde, 1984 
 Mon lieutenant, Julliard, 1985 
 Sévillanes, Julliard, 1987 
 Les culottes courtes, Le Pré-aux-Clercs, 1988 , 
 La grande maison, Le Pré-aux-Clercs, 1988  
 Le choc de 1940, Fixot, 1990 
 Les oreilles et la queue, Gallimard, 1990 
 Le roman de Carmen, Editions de Fallois, 1990 
 La rumeur de Mazamet, Le Pré aux Clers, 1991 
 L'ivresse des intellectuels : Pastis, Whisky et Marxisme, Plon, 1992 
 L'innocent, Flammarion, 1992 
 Nimeno II, torero de France, Marval, 1992 
 La folie corrida, Gallimard, 1992 
 Au fil du lait, Educagri, 1993 
 Contre-attaques : éloge incongrue du lourd, Labyrinthe, 1993 
 L'orgueil des mots, Filipacchi, 1995  (posthumous)
 Fernando Botero, la corrida, La Bibliothèque des Arts, 2001  (posthumous)
 Monsieur de Quichotte, Le Rocher, 2005  (posthumous or re-edited ?)

References

1925 births
1993 deaths
People from Aude
20th-century French writers
20th-century French male writers
Writers from Occitania (administrative region)
New Right (Europe)
French modern pagans
Modern pagan novelists
Prix Goncourt winners
French male non-fiction writers
20th-century French journalists
Le Figaro people